Ken MacDonald (3 January 1934 – 1 July 1999) was an Australian cricketer. He played two first-class matches for Tasmania between 1955 and 1956.

See also
 List of Tasmanian representative cricketers

References

External links
 

1934 births
1999 deaths
Australian cricketers
Tasmania cricketers
Cricketers from Tasmania